Longworth is an unincorporated community in Roseau County, in the U.S. state of Minnesota.

History
The community was named for Nicholas Longworth (1869–1931), an American politician.

References

Unincorporated communities in Roseau County, Minnesota
Unincorporated communities in Minnesota